Alexander Grant Clark (born 20 February 1943) is a New Zealand rower.

Clark was born in 1943 in Oamaru. He represented New Zealand at the 1964 Summer Olympics. He is listed as New Zealand Olympian athlete number 167 by the New Zealand Olympic Committee.

References

1943 births
Living people
New Zealand male rowers
Rowers at the 1964 Summer Olympics
Olympic rowers of New Zealand
Sportspeople from Oamaru